The 1989 Cleveland Indians season was their 89th season in the American League. For the 3rd consecutive season, the Indians had a losing record. The Indians had at least 73 wins for the 2nd consecutive season.

Offseason
 November 28, 1988: The Indians traded a player to be named later to the Pittsburgh Pirates for Denny González and a player to be named later. The deal was completed on March 25, 1989, with the Pirates sending Félix Fermín to the Indians and the Indians sending Jay Bell to the Pirates.
 December 2, 1988: Luis Aguayo was signed as a free agent with the Cleveland Indians.
 December 3, 1988: Jesse Orosco was signed as a free agent by the Indians.
 December 5, 1988: Bud Black was signed as a free agent by the Indians.
 December 6, 1988: Julio Franco was traded by the Indians to the Texas Rangers for Pete O'Brien, Oddibe McDowell, and Jerry Browne.
 March 26, 1989: Keith Atherton was traded by the Minnesota Twins to the Cleveland Indians for Carmelo Castillo.

Ohio Cup

The first Ohio Cup, which was an annual pre-season baseball game, was played in 1989. The single-game cup was played at Cooper Stadium in Columbus, Ohio, and was staged just days before the start of each new Major League Baseball season.

Regular season

Season standings

Record vs. opponents

Notable transactions
 June 5, 1989: 1989 Major League Baseball draft
Alan Embree was drafted by the Indians in the 5th round. Player signed September 6, 1989.
Jim Thome was drafted by the Indians in the 13th round. Player signed June 18, 1989.
Brian Giles was drafted by the Indians in the 17th round. Player signed July 18, 1989.
 June 22, 1989: Willie Cañate was signed by the Indians as an amateur free agent.
 July 2, 1989: Oddibe McDowell was traded by the Indians to the Atlanta Braves for Dion James.
 July 27, 1989: Doug Piatt was traded by the Indians to the Montreal Expos for Rick Carriger (minors).
 August 7, 1989: Keith Atherton was released by the Cleveland Indians.

Opening Day Lineup

Roster

Player stats

Batting

Starters by position
Note: Pos = Position; G = Games played; AB = At bats; H = Hits; Avg. = Batting average; HR = Home runs; RBI = Runs batted in

Other batters
Note: G = Games played; AB = At bats; H = Hits; Avg. = Batting average; HR = Home runs; RBI = Runs batted in

Pitching

Starting pitchers 
Note: G = Games pitched; IP = Innings pitched; W = Wins; L = Losses; ERA = Earned run average; SO = Strikeouts

Other pitchers 
Note: G = Games pitched; IP = Innings pitched; W = Wins; L = Losses; ERA = Earned run average; SO = Strikeouts

Relief pitchers 
Note: G = Games pitched; W = Wins; L = Losses; SV = Saves; ERA = Earned run average; SO = Strikeouts

Awards and honors
All-Star Game
 Doug Jones, relief pitcher, reserve
 Greg Swindell, pitcher, reserve

Team leaders
 Games – Joe Carter (162)
 AB – Jerry Browne (598)
 Runs – Jerry Browne (83)
 Hits – Jerry Browne (179)
 Doubles – Joe Carter (32)
 Triples – Brook Jacoby (5)
 Home runs – Joe Carter (35)
 RBI – Joe Carter (105)
 Walks – Pete O'Brien (83)
 Strikeouts – Cory Snyder (134)
 Stolen bases – Jerry Browne (14)
 Batting average – Dion James (.306)
 On-base percentage – Jerry Browne (.370)
 Hit by pitch – Joe Carter (8)
 Wins – Tom Candiotti, Greg Swindell (13)
 Strikeouts – John Farrell – (132)
 Earned run average – Greg Swindell – (3.10)
 Saves – Doug Jones – (32)

Farm system

References

1989 Cleveland Indians at Baseball Reference
1989 Cleveland Indians at Baseball Almanac

Cleveland Guardians seasons
Cleveland Indians season
Cleve